Aisha Abd al-Rahman (Arabic: عائشة عبد الرحمن; 18 November 1913 – 1 December 1998) was an Egyptian author and professor of literature who published under the pen name Bint al-Shaṭiʾ ( بِنْت ٱلشّاطِئ"Daughter of the Riverbank").

Life and career
She was born on 18 November 1913 in Damietta in the governorate of Domyat, Egypt, where her father taught at the Domyat Religious Institute. When she was ten, her mother, though illiterate, enrolled her in school while her father was traveling. Though her father objected, her mother later sent Aisha to El Mansurah for further education. Later, Aisha studied Arabic at Cairo University earning her undergraduate degree in 1939, and an M.A. degree in 1941.

In 1942, Aisha began work as an Inspector for teaching of Arabic literature for the Egyptian Ministry of Education. She earned her PhD with distinction in 1950 and was appointed Professor of Arabic Literature at the University College for Women of the Ain Shams University.

She wrote fiction and biographies of early Muslim women as well as literary criticism. She was the second modern woman to undertake Qur'anic exegesis. She did not consider herself to be a feminist, but her works reflect the belief that female authors are more capable of analyzing the life stories of women than male authors, because men are "ignorant of female instinct". 

She was married to Sheik Amin el-Khouli, her teacher at Cairo University during her undergraduate years. She died of a heart attack following a stroke in Cairo. She donated all her library to research purposes, and in 1985 a statue was built in her honor in Cairo.

Selected bibliography
The author of "more than forty books and one hundred articles", her notable publications include:
The Egyptian Countryside (1936)
The Problem of the Peasant (1938)
Secret of the Beach and Master of the Estate: The Story of a Sinful Woman (1942)
New Values in Arabic Literature (1961)
Contemporary Arab Women Poets (1963)

References

External links
 Bint Al-Shati’a, Aishah Abdul-Rahman: A Brilliant Female Scholar in the Islamic and Arab World
 Muhammad Amin A study of Bint al-Shati's Exegesis

1913 births
1998 deaths
Egyptian feminists
Cairo University alumni
Academic staff of Ain Shams University
20th-century Egyptian women writers
20th-century Egyptian writers